Maria Arndt, also known as Maria Staworzyńska and Maria Blank (20 October 1929 – 6 April 2000) was a Polish sprinter. She competed in the women's 200 metres at the 1952 Summer Olympics.

References

External links
 

1929 births
2000 deaths
Athletes (track and field) at the 1952 Summer Olympics
Polish female sprinters
Olympic athletes of Poland
People from Włodawa County
Sportspeople from Lublin Voivodeship
Olympic female sprinters